Susan Lowdermilk (born 1963) is a contemporary book artist and print maker who works "primarily in woodcut, wood engraving and etching". She also teaches graphic design and studio art classes at Lane Community College.

Education 
In 1986 Lowdermilk earned a Bachelor of Fine Arts in Printmaking and Graphic Arts  at Colorado State University, and in 1991, a Master of Fine Arts in Printmaking at the University of Oregon.

Critical reception
Denis Keogh wrote that Lowdermilk "continues to challenge the notion of what an artist's book can be through her own practice as a printmaker and book artist."

The Seattle Times noted that in the Tacoma Art Museum "Ink This!" exhibit, "There's even a zoetrope by Susan Lowdermilk that you can spin, sending her prints of rocking horses into motion."

Eadem Mutata Resurgo ('I rise the same but changed'), one of Lowdermilk's art books based on Jacob Bernoulli's miraculous spiral, was called it the "star of the show" by Art Voice of Eugene. It was also the subject of Richard Taylor's analysis of virtual fractals and "persistence of human vision to bring virtual fractals to life... incorporating her prints of fractal patterns into zoetropes and phenakistoscopes".

She serves as a juror for exhibitions of artist's books.

She has said of her work, "We often take for granted what we experience in our daily lives. Through my artwork, I attempt to show the ordinary as extraordinary. I focus on personal subjects, namely my family and my surrounding environment."

Selected exhibitions
Getty Museum
Library of Congress
New York Public Library
Portland Art Museum
2014 "Ink This!", Tacoma Art Museum
White Lotus Gallery, Eugene

References

External links
 

1963 births
20th-century American artists
20th-century American printmakers
20th-century American women artists
American women printmakers
Educators from Oregon
American women educators
Modern printmakers
Colorado State University alumni
University of Oregon alumni
Living people
21st-century American women artists